Invagesic is a combination drug consisting of:
 caffeine
 salicylic acid
 orphenadrine

It is indicated for management of fatigue, orthostatic hypotension and for the short-term treatment of apnea of prematurity in infants.

References

Combination drugs